Kaleidoscopes is a series of instrumental music albums by Zambian born Canadian composer Hennie Bekker. There are four albums in the series, namely Spring Rain, Summer Breeze, Autumn Magic, and Winter Reflections. The albums contain New Age based original, contemporary instrumental compositions ranging from string and piano arrangements, to ethereal orchestration enhanced by synthesizer. Spring Rain is the first album in the series and was originally released in 1992 and distributed by Canadian independent record distributor Holborne Distributing Co. Winter Reflections is the most recent release in the series. All four albums are released on Bekker's independent record label, Abbeywood Records.

External links
 Hennie Bekker Official Website
 Abbeywood Records Official Website

Hennie Bekker albums